Bad Godesberg Stadthalle is a station on the Bonn Stadtbahn, in Bad Godesberg, Germany. It is the terminus of the Bad Godesberg branch served by the all-day routes 16 and 63 and the peak-hour line 67. It is located beneath the Bad Godesberg Stadthalle, an events space.

References 

Cologne-Bonn Stadtbahn stations